Santonio Holmes Jr. (born March 3, 1984) is an American former professional football player who was a wide receiver in the National Football League (NFL). He was drafted by the Pittsburgh Steelers in the first round of the 2006 NFL Draft after playing college football at Ohio State University. In 2009, Holmes was named the most valuable player (MVP) of Super Bowl XLIII as the Steelers beat the Arizona Cardinals. In 2010, Holmes was traded to the New York Jets in exchange for the Jets' fifth round pick. Holmes also played a season for the Chicago Bears.

Early years
Holmes attended Glades Central High School in Belle Glade, Florida. He was a letterman in football, basketball, and track. In football, he helped lead his team to two state titles and a 12–1 record as a senior. In basketball, he helped lead his team to a state runner-up finish as a senior. In track, his team won the state title during his junior year, and he was the member of a 4x400 meter relay team that won two state titles, and recorded a personal-best time of 49.85 seconds in the 400 meters. Santonio graduated from Glades Central High School in 2002 with a 3.4 GPA.

College career
Holmes attended Ohio State University where he was red shirted when the Buckeyes won the 2002 National Championship. Holmes caught 140 passes for 2,295 yards and 25 touchdowns, while gaining 3,123 all-purpose yards. His 140 career receptions and 3,496 yards were ranked the fifth highest totals in school history at the time. His 25 touchdown catches ranked him 3rd in the NCAA.

Professional career

2006 NFL Combine

Pittsburgh Steelers

2006
Holmes left college a year early and was taken in the first round (25th overall) of the 2006 NFL Draft by the defending Super Bowl XL champion Pittsburgh Steelers. The 25th pick overall, he was the first receiver since Plaxico Burress taken in the first round by the Steelers. The Steelers traded up with the New York Giants from 31st to draft Holmes. Holmes, who wore number 4 at Ohio State (a number that wasn't issued to wide receivers in the NFL until 2021), was issued number 10, previously worn in Pittsburgh by former kicker Roy Gerela and quarterback Kordell Stewart.

Early on in the Steelers' disappointing 2006 season, Holmes was criticized for his poor performance on special teams as a returner, a role in which he fumbled frequently. However, Holmes had better success as a receiver, displaying his athleticism and skill in several of the Steelers' games. He earned Week 6 Diet Pepsi Rookie of the Week honors for his performance October 15 against the Kansas City Chiefs, totaling 58 yards receiving and 13 yards rushing.

Late in the season, Holmes replaced Cedrick Wilson in the starting lineup and finished the 2006 regular season with 49 receptions for 824 yards and 2 touchdowns. His best play of the season was also the last, when, in overtime of the Steelers' final game of the season against the Cincinnati Bengals, Holmes caught a pass from Ben Roethlisberger on a slant route and ran for a 67-yard touchdown to secure a win for the Steelers. He also returned a punt 65 yards for a touchdown on December 17 against the Carolina Panthers.

2007
Holmes was named the Steelers' starting split end coming into training camp. He enjoyed a breakout season in 2007 as he led the Steelers in receiving yards, receiving touchdowns, and emerged as one of the better known deep threats in the NFL. In Week 1 of the season against the Cleveland Browns, Holmes caught a 40-yard touchdown pass from Ben Roethlisberger as they went on to defeat the Browns 34–7. Week 4 in a loss against the Arizona Cardinals, he enjoyed one of the best games in his young pro career as he finished the game with 6 receptions, 128 yards, and 2 touchdown catches. In Week 9, he enjoyed another two touchdown game against the Baltimore Ravens, both touchdowns came in the first half. He finished the game with 4 catches, 110 yards, and two touchdowns. In Week 16, Santonio Holmes amassed the most yards receiving in a game in his career, as he finished the game with 133 yards receiving against the St. Louis Rams. He finished the year with 942 yards receiving and 8 touchdown catches. He led the league in yards per catch.

In his first career playoff game, a 31–29 loss to the Jacksonville Jaguars, he finished the game with 3 catches, 49 yards, and a touchdown.

2008
Despite returning no punts throughout the 2007 season, Holmes explored returning again for the 2008 season. During the offseason, Holmes had set a goal to play in all 16 games throughout the season, increasing his weight by 11 pounds through workouts in the offseason.

Holmes began the season with 2 receptions for 19 yards in a win against the Houston Texans. In the following 10–6 win over the Cleveland Browns, Holmes totaled 94 yards on 5 receptions and had a carry for 10 yards. In the following loss to the Eagles, he recorded 3 receptions for 32 yards. Holmes saw his first score the following week in an overtime win against the Baltimore Ravens, finishing with 61 yards on 3 receptions for a touchdown. Following a bye week, Holmes totaled 89 yards on 5 receptions in the win against the Cincinnati Bengals.

However, Holmes was benched following being arrested for possession of marijuana. Holmes was benched by coach Tomlin twice. He was forced to miss the following loss to the New York Giants, but was activated again for the Monday Night game against the Washington Redskins.

Statistically, Holmes' production decreased when compared to his 2007 stats. He declined in receptions, receiving yards, and receiving average. However, Holmes' still contributed big plays throughout the season, especially during the game versus the Cowboys where he caught a long pass that ignited a struggling Steelers offense.

In Super Bowl XLIII, Holmes secured the Steelers' NFL-record 6th Super Bowl win after catching a 6-yard touchdown pass from Ben Roethlisberger with 35 seconds left in regulation. Holmes caught nine passes for 131 yards and a touchdown, including four receptions for 73 yards on their final game-winning drive. He was named Super Bowl MVP, becoming the sixth wide receiver to win the award, and also was the third Pittsburgh receiver to win the award, following Lynn Swann in Super Bowl X and Hines Ward in Super Bowl XL.

2009
Statistically, 2009 was the best season of his career. He had 79 catches, 1,248 receiving yards, and five touchdowns and became Pittsburgh's first receiving target in which was surprisingly his last year with the team. He was traded during the offseason due to his brushes with the law (see section Legal trouble).

New York Jets

2010
On April 11, 2010, Holmes was traded to the New York Jets in exchange for a fifth-round pick in the 2010 NFL Draft (the Steelers eventually traded the pick to the Arizona Cardinals in exchange for a sixth round pick, which they used to draft Antonio Brown, and reacquiring Bryant McFadden; the Cardinals used the pick on quarterback John Skelton). Shortly before the trade, the NFL announced that Holmes would be suspended for the first four games of the season due to a violation of the NFL's substance abuse policy.

The trade came after Holmes' incident in a nightclub, coinciding with Ben Roethlisberger's own legal troubles, and the Steelers wanting to set an example for its other players. Had Holmes not been traded, the Steelers would have released him.

After serving a four-game suspension for violating the league's substance abuse policy, Holmes returned to practice on October 6, 2010. Although Holmes was forbidden to participate in practices with his teammates and he was suspended from playing for the Jets during their regular season contests, he was still eligible to attend team meetings and work out daily at the team's facilities.

On November 14, 2010, with 22 seconds to go in overtime against the Cleveland Browns, Holmes caught a pass on the Browns 31-yard line and carried it in for a touchdown, giving the Jets a 26–20 victory.

The very next week, on November 21, 2010, Holmes caught a game-winning touchdown from Mark Sanchez with 10 seconds left and the Jets went on to beat the Houston Texans 30–27.

During the 2010-2011 postseason, the Jets made it to the AFC Championship Game before losing to Holmes' former team, the Pittsburgh Steelers.

2011
Holmes re-signed with the Jets during the offseason, shortly before the start of 2011 season agreeing to a 5-year deal. He was named one of the team captains, along with starting quarterback Mark Sanchez, before the season began. In the 4th quarter of the final game of the 2011 season against the Miami Dolphins, Holmes appeared to get into an argument with Jets offensive tackle Wayne Hunter while the team was huddling. As a result of the argument, Holmes was benched for the remainder of the game, and the Jets ended up losing the game, which resulted in the Jets missing the postseason for the first time in 3 years. His leadership qualities and credibility as a captain have since been questioned.

Holmes finished the season with just 51 catches, the second lowest total of his career, along with only 654 receiving yards, by far the lowest total of his career. He also finished with a career low 12.8 yards per reception average. He did, however, tally a new career high in touchdown receptions with 8.

2012
Holmes was lost for the remainder of the 2012 season after sustaining a severe Lisfranc foot injury in Week 4 against the San Francisco 49ers, and was eventually placed on injured reserve.

2013
The Jets approached Holmes in the offseason to restructure his contract; Holmes obliged. Holmes' rehabilitation from foot surgery continued into training camp and the preseason. Holmes was removed from the active/physically unable to perform list and moved to the active roster on August 23, 2013.

Holmes was released by the Jets on March 10, 2014.

Chicago Bears

2014
Holmes signed a one-year contract with the Chicago Bears on August 16, 2014. Holmes was waived on November 11, 2014, having played just nine games and totaling only 8 receptions for 67 yards.

Retirement
After being out of the league for nearly three years, Holmes returned to the Steelers on October 10, 2017, for a retirement ceremony, saying: "It's an honor to retire as a member of the Steelers and leave a legacy everyone will remember."

NFL career statistics

Regular season

Postseason

Legal trouble
Holmes has acknowledged selling drugs on the street corner of his hometown of Belle Glade, Florida as a teenager; he says that his mother's influence and a desire to play professional football made him decide to stop.

Holmes was arrested in Miami Beach, Florida on May 27, 2006, for disorderly conduct. Charges were subsequently dropped after Holmes paid a fine. Holmes was arrested for a second time on June 18, 2006, for domestic violence and assault in Columbus, Ohio.

On July 7, 2006, Holmes appeared in Franklin County Court in Columbus, Ohio for both a pre-trial hearing regarding the domestic case and a hearing regarding the traffic ticket. He pleaded no contest to the traffic ticket and agreed to pay a fine. While Lashae Boone, the mother of Holmes' daughter and the victim in the assault case, requested that the domestic violence and assault charges be dropped, the prosecutor refused. Boone and their daughter accompanied Holmes to court. The charges were later dropped.

On October 23, 2008, Holmes was arrested in Pittsburgh and cited by officers for possession of marijuana. He released an apology after missing a game, stating that he wished to "focus all of [his] efforts on helping our team win on the field and achieve its ultimate goal."

On March 24, 2010, Anshonae Mills filed a lawsuit against Holmes over a March 7 incident in which she alleges Holmes threw a glass at her in an Orlando nightclub, resulting in a cut above her eye. Initially, Mills did not pursue charges, claiming Holmes and the police intimidated her into it, but the case has been reopened. Subsequently, after a Twitter comment criticizing the nightclub incident, Holmes told the follower to "kill urself." He later Tweeted it was time to "wake n bake," a reference to marijuana.  Holmes alleges his account was hacked and it was not him making the comments.

On April 29, 2010, according to a report filed by authorities at Pittsburgh International Airport, a flight attendant told police that Holmes wouldn't turn off his iPod when requested and asked that officers speak to him. Holmes got off the Colgan Air flight and spoke to the officers, who reminded him to comply with regulations, but did not charge the wide receiver with anything. Holmes later talked to Jets head coach Rex Ryan about the incident.

References

External links

 Ohio State Buckeyes bio
 New York Jets bio
 Chicago Bears bio

1984 births
Living people
African-American players of American football
American football wide receivers
Chicago Bears players
New York Jets players
Ohio State Buckeyes football players
People from Belle Glade, Florida
Pittsburgh Steelers players
Players of American football from Florida
Players of American football from Pittsburgh
Sportspeople from the Miami metropolitan area
Super Bowl MVPs